Graham E. Bell is an American amateur astronomer and prolific discoverer of minor planets.

Along with amateur astronomer Gary Hug, he operates the U.S. Farpoint Observatory in Eskridge, Kansas.

He is credited by the Minor Planet Center with the discovery of 56 numbered minor planets between 1998 and 2000. He also co-discovered 178P/Hug-Bell, a periodic comet.

List of discovered minor planets

References 
 

 The American Association of Amateur Astronomers - Graham Bell

20th-century American  astronomers
Discoverers of asteroids
Discoverers of comets

Living people
Year of birth missing (living people)